The Bureau of Industrial Research was a New York City-based labor research organization.

History
In 1920, the Industrial Workers of the World (IWW) created the Bureau of Industrial Research to address such issues, in part due to the influence of the technocratic ideas of Howard Scott. In 1921, a series of articles by or about the Bureau appeared in the Industrial Pioneer.

Description
The group described itself as an organization "to promote sound human relationships in industry by consultation, fact studies and publicity."  Its Manhattan offices had a library on current industrial relations.  It offered to supply data "at moderate cost" to interested parties, whether individuals, corporations, labor organizations, or the press.

Members
In 1921, its members included:
 Robert W. Bruère (director)
 Herbert Croly (treasurer)
 Heber Blankenhorn
 Mary D. Blankenhorn
 Arthur Gleason
 Leonard Outhwaite
 Ordway Tead
 Savel Zimand

Publications

 How the Government Handled Its Labor Problems During the War (1919)
 Industrial Council Plan in Great Britain (1919)
 Report on the Steel Strike of 1919 (1919)
 Workers' Education (1921)
 Public Opinion and the Steel Strike (1921)
 National Council for the Printing Trades (1921)
 Modern Social Movements (1921)
 In Non-Union Mines (1922)
 Open Shop Drive; Who is Behind it and Where is it Going? (1921)
 Strike for Union (1924)
 Anthracite Question (1924)

See also
 Industrial Workers of the World
 Labor Research Association

References

External links
 UPenn: "Bureau of Industrial Research"
 NYPL "Bureau of Industrial Research"

20th-century establishments
Research institutes